Trifolium variegatum is a species of clover known by the common name whitetip clover. It is native to western North America from southern Alaska and British Columbia to Baja California, where it occurs in many types of habitat.

Description
Trifolium variegatum is a variable plant, taking many forms. It is an annual or possibly sometimes perennial herb growing prostrate to upright in form, thin to fleshy and usually hairless in texture. The leaves are made up of usually three variously shaped leaflets with serrated edges.

The inflorescence is a headlike cluster containing a single flower or many flowers in a cluster over 2 centimeters wide. At its base is a fused involucre of bracts. Each flower has a calyx of sepals narrowing to bristle-like tips. The flower corolla is generally purplish in color and usually has a white tip. It grows in habitats with dry, sandy soil to moist meadows.

References

External links
 Calflora Database: Trifolium variegatum (Variegated clover, whitetip clover)
Jepson Manual eFlora (TJM2) treatment of Trifolium variegatum
USDA Plants Profile for Trifolium variegatum (whitetip clover)
Washington Burke Museum
UC CalPhotos gallery: Trifolium variegatum

variegatum
Flora of the West Coast of the United States
Flora of Alaska
Flora of British Columbia
Flora of California
Flora of Baja California
Flora of the Sierra Nevada (United States)
Natural history of the California chaparral and woodlands
Natural history of the California Coast Ranges
Natural history of the Peninsular Ranges
Natural history of the Transverse Ranges
Flora without expected TNC conservation status